Slaight is an English surname. Notable people with the surname include:

 Allan Slaight (1931–2021), Canadian rock and roll radio pioneer, media mogul, and philanthropist
 Brad Slaight (born 1964), American actor
 Gary Slaight, one of the founders of Canada's Walk of Fame

See also
 Slaight Communications, Canadian radio broadcasting company

English-language surnames